Buenavista, officially the Municipality of Buenavista,  is a 1st class municipality in the province of Agusan del Norte, Philippines. According to the 2020 census, it has a population of 68,892 people.

History
 

The written history of Buenavista start in the year 1877. It was said that during this year a group of nomadic Manobo from the frontiers of Agusan found an ideal place for their tempora-fishing retreat and rendezvous.

Soon, the village of Tortosa was founded by two Christian pioneers, Innocentes Paler and Marcelo Dalaguida, who were later on joined by Luis Gupana and a handful of Manobo. Credited with a name to the village were a group of natives and Spaniards who visited the place to trade with the villagers and found the place to be abundant with the sea tortoise.

The fame of Tortosa as a good fishing was heard by the people of the neighboring Butuan. Thus a fresh wave migrants came to settle.

Later, Tortosa was renamed to Kihaw-an in memory of a white deer held sacred by the early inhabitants. It was said that this deer was found dead by the natives near the bank of the river which encircles the village. Its carcass was placed all over the village thus the village got the name Kihaw-an, a derivative of a local dialect "Baho-an", which literally mean "to smell", or "source of bad smell".

Soon the village got another new name. It was said that Adolfo Calo, a native of Butuan, together with some natives and Spaniards visited the place. They expanded their visits not only the coastal areas where flourishing because of the abundance of fish.
At the top of the hill they saw the village overlooking the sea. They appreciated the beauty of nature in abundance. They exclaimed "Bien Vista", which means "Good View" thus the present name Buenavista.

Enticed by the abundance of fish and the good prospect for agriculture, a new wave migrants from the neighboring areas continued to flock to Buenavista. Between the years 1897–1907, settlers and their families were known to have settled in the place.

The only means of transportation was by banca or fishing boats, and by horseback trudging the small mountain trails. It was only sometime in the 1920s when Buenavista was connected to Butuan by means of road. It was also given power by the Marcon Electric Company of the Marcon family but later on, operation was taken over by the government-owned electric distribution facility.

Efforts of the pioneers paid off, because sometime in early 1920s, Buenavista was declared a regular barrio of the then Municipality of Butuan. As a barrio, Buenavista was able to form its own law-making body which was locally called Ang Tingug Sa Lungsod, whose members were known as podientes.

"Municipality of Buenavista" through the efforts of Assemblyman Apolonio D. Curato and Governor Jose R. Rosales, Commissioner of Mindanao and Sulu Teofisto Guingona Sr., and Secretary of the Interior, Elpidio Quirino, with a set of appointed officials to serve for a period of one year.

Geography
According to the Philippine Statistics Authority, the municipality has a land area of  constituting  of the  total area of Agusan del Norte.

Climate

Barangays
Buenavista is politically subdivided into 25 barangays.

Demographics

In the 2020 census, Buenavista had a population of 68,892.

Economy

Education

Elementary

 Abilan Elementary School
 Agong-ong Elementary School
 Bagang Elementary School
 Buenavista Central Elementary School
 Buenavista Institute  (Grade School)
 Buenavista Special Education Elementary School
 Calaitan Elementary School
 Cogon Elementary School
 Dalao-an Elementary School
 Datu Saldong Elementary School
 F.S. OMAYANA Elementary School
 Guinabsan Elementary School
 Kabalalahan Elementary School
 Labong Elementary School
 Lekda Elementary School
 Linao-linao Elementary School
 Lomboyan Elementary School
 Lower Olave Elementary School
 Macalang Elementary School
 Malapong Elementary School
 Malpoc Elementary School
 Manapa Elementary School
 Manapa IS (Grade School)
 Matabao Elementary School
 Monteverde Elementary School
 New Bohol Elementary School
 Rizal Elementary School
 Sacol Elementary School
 San juan Elementary School
 San Roque Elementary School
 Sangay Elementary School
 SPED Elementary School
 Simbalan Elementary School
 Talo-ao Elementary School
 Tanutao Elementary School
 Tapnigue Elementary School
 TINAGO Elementary School
 Upper Olave Elementary School

Secondary

 Abilan IS
 Agong-ong IS
 FS Omayana Elementary School (Alubihid)
 FS Omayana National High School (Alubihid)
 Buenavista Institute
 Buenavista National High School
 Buenavista SPED- High School
 Guinabsan National High School
 Lekda National High School
 Manapa ISS
 Rizal IS
 Saint James High School
 Sangay National High School
 Simbalan National High School

References

External links
 [ Philippine Standard Geographic Code]

Municipalities of Agusan del Norte
Establishments by Philippine executive order